Eric Zucker (born October 4, 1963) is a sailor who represented the United States Virgin Islands. He competed in the 470 event at the 1984 Summer Olympics.

References

External links
 
 

1963 births
Living people
United States Virgin Islands male sailors (sport)
Olympic sailors of the United States Virgin Islands
Sailors at the 1984 Summer Olympics – 470
Place of birth missing (living people)